Mourinho is a Portuguese surname. Notable people with the surname include:

 José Mourinho (born 1963), is a Portuguese manager
 Félix Mourinho (1938–2017), former Portuguese professional footballer and coach, father of José Mourinho

See also
Mouriño, Spanish equivalent
Morino, Italian and Japanese equivalent

Portuguese-language surnames